China Social Sciences Press (CSSP, traditional Chinese: 中國社會科學出版社; simplified Chinese: 中国社会科学出版社), also known as Social Sciences in China Press, is a Chinese state-level publishing house sponsored and managed by the Chinese Academy of Social Sciences, which publishes academic works in the humanities and social sciences. 

China Social Sciences Publishing House was proposed by Hu Qiaomu and officially established on 14 June 1978 after the instructions of Deng Xiaoping, Li Xiannian, Hua Guofeng and others of the Central Committee of the Chinese Communist Party.

In October 2020, the United States Department of State designated China Social Sciences Press as a "foreign mission" (外国使团) of China.

See also 
Academic publishing in China
China Science Publishing & Media
Science and technology in the People's Republic of China

References

External links 

 

Publishing companies of China
State publishers
1978 establishments in China
Chinese Academy of Social Sciences
Companies based in Beijing